This is a list of butterflies of Cameroon. About 1,593 species are known from Cameroon, 110 of which are endemic.

Papilionidae

Papilioninae

Papilionini
Papilio antimachus Drury, 1782
Papilio zalmoxis Hewitson, 1864
Papilio nireus Linnaeus, 1758
Papilio charopus Westwood, 1843
Papilio chrapkowskoides nurettini Koçak, 1983
Papilio sosia sosia Rothschild & Jordan, 1903
Papilio sosia pulchra Berger, 1950
Papilio cynorta Fabricius, 1793
Papilio plagiatus Aurivillius, 1898
Papilio dardanus Brown, 1776
Papilio phorcas congoanus Rothschild, 1896
Papilio rex schultzei Aurivillius, 1904
Papilio zenobia Fabricius, 1775
Papilio cyproeofila praecyola Suffert, 1904
Papilio filaprae Suffert, 1904
Papilio gallienus Distant, 1879
Papilio mechowi Dewitz, 1881
Papilio demodocus Esper, [1798]
Papilio echerioides zoroastres Druce, 1878
Papilio hesperus Westwood, 1843
Papilio menestheus Drury, 1773
Papilio lormieri Distant, 1874
Papilio andronicus Ward, 1871

Leptocercini
Graphium antheus (Cramer, 1779)
Graphium policenes policenes (Cramer, 1775)
Graphium policenes telloi Hecq, 1999
Graphium biokoensis (Gauthier, 1984)
Graphium policenoides (Holland, 1892)
Graphium illyris hamatus (Joicey & Talbot, 1918)
Graphium angolanus baronis (Ungemach, 1932)
Graphium ridleyanus (White, 1843)
Graphium leonidas (Fabricius, 1793)
Graphium tynderaeus (Fabricius, 1793)
Graphium latreillianus theorini (Aurivillius, 1881)
Graphium adamastor (Boisduval, 1836)
Graphium agamedes (Westwood, 1842)
Graphium schubotzi schubotzi (Schultze, 1913)
Graphium schubotzi maculata Libert, 2007
Graphium almansor escherichi (Gaede, 1915)
Graphium auriger (Butler, 1876)
Graphium fulleri fulleri (Grose-Smith, 1883)
Graphium fulleri boulleti (Le Cerf, 1912)
Graphium ucalegonides (Staudinger, 1884)
Graphium hachei hachei (Dewitz, 1881)
Graphium hachei moebii (Suffert, 1904)
Graphium ucalegon (Hewitson, 1865)
Graphium simoni (Aurivillius, 1899)

Pieridae

Pseudopontiinae
Pseudopontia paradoxa (Felder & Felder, 1869)

Coliadinae
Eurema brigitta (Stoll, [1780])
Eurema hapale (Mabille, 1882)
Eurema hecabe solifera (Butler, 1875)
Eurema senegalensis (Boisduval, 1836)
Catopsilia florella (Fabricius, 1775)
Colias electo manengoubensis Darge, 1968

Pierinae
Colotis antevippe (Boisduval, 1836)
Colotis celimene sudanicus (Aurivillius, 1905)
Colotis elgonensis glauningi (Schultze, 1909)
Colotis euippe (Linnaeus, 1758)
Colotis protomedia (Klug, 1829)
Nepheronia argia (Fabricius, 1775)
Nepheronia pharis (Boisduval, 1836)
Nepheronia thalassina verulanus (Ward, 1871)
Leptosia alcesta (Stoll, [1782])
Leptosia bastini Hecq, 1997
Leptosia hybrida Bernardi, 1952
Leptosia marginea (Mabille, 1890)
Leptosia nupta (Butler, 1873)
Leptosia wigginsi pseudalcesta Bernardi, 1965

Pierini
Appias epaphia (Cramer, [1779])
Appias perlucens (Butler, 1898)
Appias phaola (Doubleday, 1847)
Appias sabina (Felder & Felder, [1865])
Appias sylvia (Fabricius, 1775)
Mylothris agathina richlora Suffert, 1904
Mylothris alcuana Grünberg, 1910
Mylothris asphodelus Butler, 1888
Mylothris basalis Aurivillius, 1906
Mylothris bernice (Hewitson, 1866)
Mylothris chloris (Fabricius, 1775)
Mylothris continua maxima Berger, 1981
Mylothris elodina Talbot, 1944
Mylothris flaviana flaviana Grose-Smith, 1898
Mylothris flaviana interposita Joicey & Talbot, 1921
Mylothris hilara hilara (Karsch, 1892)
Mylothris hilara goma Berger, 1981
Mylothris jacksoni knutssoni Aurivillius, 1891
Mylothris jaopura Karsch, 1893
Mylothris nubila (Möschler, 1884)
Mylothris ochracea Aurivillius, 1895
Mylothris rembina (Plötz, 1880)
Mylothris rhodope (Fabricius, 1775)
Mylothris schumanni Suffert, 1904
Mylothris sjostedti Aurivillius, 1895
Mylothris sulphurea Aurivillius, 1895
Mylothris yulei bansoana Talbot, 1944
Dixeia capricornus capricornus (Ward, 1871)
Dixeia capricornus falkensteinii (Dewitz, 1879)
Dixeia cebron (Ward, 1871)
Dixeia doxo (Godart, 1819)
Dixeia orbona (Geyer, [1837])
Dixeia pigea (Boisduval, 1836)
Belenois aurota (Fabricius, 1793)
Belenois calypso dentigera Butler, 1888
Belenois solilucis Butler, 1874
Belenois subeida (Felder & Felder, 1865)
Belenois sudanensis pseudodentigera Berger, 1981
Belenois theora theora (Doubleday, 1846)
Belenois theora ratheo (Suffert, 1904)
Belenois theuszi (Dewitz, 1889)
Belenois zochalia connexiva (Joicey & Talbot, 1927)

Lycaenidae

Miletinae

Liphyrini
Euliphyra hewitsoni Aurivillius, 1899
Euliphyra mirifica Holland, 1890
Euliphyra leucyania (Hewitson, 1874)
Aslauga bella Bethune-Baker, 1913
Aslauga aura Druce, 1913
Aslauga bitjensis Bethune-Baker, 1925
Aslauga bouyeri Libert, 1994
Aslauga camerunica Stempffer, 1969
Aslauga confusa Libert, 1994
Aslauga febe (Libert, 1994)
Aslauga imitans Libert, 1994
Aslauga kallimoides Schultze, 1912
Aslauga lamborni Bethune-Baker, 1914
Aslauga marginalis Kirby, 1890
Aslauga marshalli adamaoua Libert, 1994
Aslauga modesta Schultze, 1923
Aslauga pandora Druce, 1913
Aslauga prouvosti Libert & Bouyer, 1997
Aslauga purpurascens Holland, 1890
Aslauga satyroides Libert, 1994
Aslauga vininga (Hewitson, 1875)

Miletini
Megalopalpus angulosus Grünberg, 1910
Megalopalpus metaleucus Karsch, 1893
Megalopalpus simplex Röber, 1886
Megalopalpus zymna (Westwood, 1851)
Spalgis lemolea lemolea Druce, 1890
Spalgis lemolea pilos Druce, 1890
Lachnocnema emperamus (Snellen, 1872)
Lachnocnema divergens Gaede, 1915
Lachnocnema vuattouxi Libert, 1996
Lachnocnema reutlingeri Holland, 1892
Lachnocnema nigrocellularis Libert, 1996
Lachnocnema luna Druce, 1910
Lachnocnema brunea Libert, 1996
Lachnocnema jolyana Libert, 1996
Lachnocnema magna Aurivillius, 1895
Lachnocnema albimacula Libert, 1996
Lachnocnema exiguus Holland, 1890
Lachnocnema disrupta Talbot, 1935

Poritiinae

Liptenini
Ptelina carnuta (Hewitson, 1873)
Pentila maculata maculata (Kirby, 1887)
Pentila maculata pardalena Druce, 1910
Pentila amenaidoides (Holland, 1893)
Pentila auga Karsch, 1895
Pentila bitje Druce, 1910
Pentila camerunica Stempffer & Bennett, 1961
Pentila christina Suffert, 1904
Pentila cloetensi aspasia Grünberg, 1910
Pentila fallax Bethune-Baker, 1915
Pentila fidonioides Schultze, 1923
Pentila glagoessa (Holland, 1893)
Pentila hewitsoni limbata (Holland, 1893)
Pentila inconspicua Druce, 1910
Pentila mesia Hulstaert, 1924
Pentila nero (Grose-Smith & Kirby, 1894)
Pentila occidentalium Aurivillius, 1899
Pentila pauli pauli Staudinger, 1888
Pentila pauli leopardina Schultze, 1923
Pentila pseudorotha Stempffer & Bennett, 1961
Pentila rotha marianna Suffert, 1904
Pentila tachyroides Dewitz, 1879
Pentila umangiana prodita Schultze, 1923
Liptenara batesi Bethune-Baker, 1915
Telipna acraea acraea (Westwood, [1851])
Telipna acraea fervida (Grose-Smith & Kirby, 1890)
Telipna albofasciata Aurivillius, 1910
Telipna ja Bethune-Baker, 1926
Telipna cameroonensis Jackson, 1969
Telipna atrinervis Hulstaert, 1924
Telipna hollandi exsuperia Hulstaert, 1924
Telipna citrimaculata Schultze, 1916
Telipna transverstigma Druce, 1910
Telipna sanguinea (Plötz, 1880)
Telipna consanguinea Rebel, 1914
Telipna erica Suffert, 1904
Telipna nyanza katangae Stempffer, 1961
Telipna ruspinoides Schultze, 1923
Ornipholidotos kirbyi (Aurivillius. 1895)
Ornipholidotos ugandae goodi Libert, 2000
Ornipholidotos bitjeensis Stempffer, 1957
Ornipholidotos bakotae Stempffer, 1962
Ornipholidotos ayissii Libert, 2005
Ornipholidotos etoumbi Stempffer, 1967
Ornipholidotos katangae kelle Stempffer, 1967
Ornipholidotos nigeriae Stempffer, 1964
Ornipholidotos annae Libert, 2005
Ornipholidotos amieti Libert, 2005
Ornipholidotos evoei Libert, 2005
Ornipholidotos overlaeti fontainei Libert, 2005
Ornipholidotos gemina Libert, 2000
Ornipholidotos onitshae Stempffer, 1962
Ornipholidotos congoensis Stempffer, 1964
Ornipholidotos michelae Libert, 2000
Ornipholidotos dargei Libert, 2000
Ornipholidotos jacksoni occidentalis Libert, 2005
Ornipholidotos goodgerae Libert, 2000
Ornipholidotos sylpha (Kirby, 1890)
Ornipholidotos nbeti Libert, 2005
Ornipholidotos irwini Collins & Larsen, 1998
Ornipholidotos henrii Libert, 2000
Ornipholidotos tirza (Hewitson, 1873)
Ornipholidotos paradoxa (Druce, 1910)
Ornipholidotos perfragilis (Holland, 1890)
Ornipholidotos sylphida (Staudinger, 1892)
Ornipholidotos mathildae Libert, 2000
Ornipholidotos ackeryi Libert, 2000
Ornipholidotos kennedyi Libert, 2005
Torbenia larseni (Stempffer, 1969)
Torbenia aurivilliusi (Stempffer, 1967)
Torbenia stempfferi stempfferi Collins & Larsen, 2000
Torbenia stempfferi littoralis Collins & Larsen, 2000
Torbenia stempfferi cuypersi Libert, 2005
Torbenia persimilis Libert, 2000
Cooksonia abri Collins & Larsen, 2008
Mimacraea febe Libert, 2000
Mimacraea charmian Grose-Smith & Kirby, 1889
Mimacraea darwinia Butler, 1872
Mimacraea apicalis Grose-Smith & Kirby, 1889
Mimacraea krausei camerunica Libert, 2000
Mimacraea landbecki Druce, 1910
Mimacraea neavei Eltringham, 1909
Mimacraea paragora Rebel, 1911
Mimacraea telloides Schultze, 1923
Mimeresia cellularis (Kirby, 1890)
Mimeresia debora (Kirby, 1890)
Mimeresia dinora (Kirby, 1890)
Mimeresia drucei (Stempffer, 1954)
Mimeresia favillacea (Grünberg, 1910)
Mimeresia libentina (Hewitson, 1866)
Mimeresia moreelsi tessmanni (Grünberg, 1910)
Mimeresia russulus (Druce, 1910)
Liptena albomacula Hawker-Smith, 1933
Liptena amabilis Schultze, 1923
Liptena augusta Suffert, 1904
Liptena batesana Bethune-Baker, 1926
Liptena boei Libert, 1993
Liptena bolivari Kheil, 1905
Liptena catalina (Grose-Smith & Kirby, 1887)
Liptena confusa Aurivillius, 1899
Liptena decempunctata Schultze, 1923
Liptena decipiens decipiens (Kirby, 1890)
Liptena decipiens leucostola (Holland, 1890)
Liptena despecta (Holland, 1890)
Liptena durbania Bethune-Baker, 1915
Liptena eketi Bethune-Baker, 1926
Liptena liberti Collins, Larsen & Rawlins, 2008
Liptena eukrinaria Bethune-Baker, 1926
Liptena lloydi Collins & Larsen, 2008
Liptena evanescens (Kirby, 1887)
Liptena fatima (Kirby, 1890)
Liptena ferrymani (Grose-Smith & Kirby, 1891)
Liptena flavicans flavicans (Grose-Smith & Kirby, 1891)
Liptena flavicans oniens Talbot, 1935
Liptena flavicans praeusta Schultze, 1917
Liptena inframacula Hawker-Smith, 1933
Liptena intermedia Grünberg, 1910
Liptena modesta (Kirby, 1890)
Liptena occidentalis Bethune-Baker, 1926
Liptena ochrea Hawker-Smith, 1933
Liptena opaca opaca (Kirby, 1890)
Liptena opaca centralis Stempffer, Bennett & May, 1974
Liptena orubrum (Holland, 1890)
Liptena ouesso Stempffer, Bennett & May, 1974
Liptena perobscura Druce, 1910
Liptena praestans congoensis Schultze, 1923
Liptena sauberi Schultze, 1912
Liptena septistrigata (Bethune-Baker, 1903)
Liptena similis (Kirby, 1890)
Liptena subundularis (Staudinger, 1892)
Liptena titei Stempffer, Bennett & May, 1974
Liptena tricolora (Bethune-Baker, 1915)
Liptena turbata (Kirby, 1890)
Liptena undularis Hewitson, 1866
Liptena xanthostola (Holland, 1890)
Liptena yakadumae Schultze, 1917
Obania subvariegata (Grose-Smith & Kirby, 1890)
Obania tullia (Staudinger, 1892)
Kakumia ferruginea (Schultze, 1923)
Kakumia otlauga (Grose-Smith & Kirby, 1890)
Tetrarhanis ilala etoumbi (Stempffer, 1964)
Tetrarhanis laminifer Clench, 1965
Tetrarhanis nubifera (Druce, 1910)
Tetrarhanis ogojae (Stempffer, 1961)
Tetrarhanis okwangwo Larsen, 1998
Tetrarhanis schoutedeni (Berger, 1954)
Tetrarhanis simplex (Aurivillius, 1895)
Tetrarhanis stempfferi (Berger, 1954)
Falcuna campimus campimus (Holland, 1890)
Falcuna campimus dilatata (Schultze, 1923)
Falcuna dorotheae Stempffer & Bennett, 1963
Falcuna hollandi suffusa Stempffer & Bennett, 1963
Falcuna libyssa libyssa (Hewitson, 1866)
Falcuna libyssa cameroonica Stempffer & Bennett, 1963
Falcuna lybia (Staudinger, 1892)
Falcuna margarita (Suffert, 1904)
Falcuna reducta Stempffer & Bennett, 1963
Falcuna synesia fusca Stempffer & Bennett, 1963
Larinopoda batesi Bethune-Baker, 1926
Larinopoda lagyra (Hewitson, 1866)
Larinopoda lircaea (Hewitson, 1866)
Larinopoda tera (Hewitson, 1873)
Micropentila adelgitha (Hewitson, 1874)
Micropentila adelgunda (Staudinger, 1892)
Micropentila bitjeana Stempffer & Bennett, 1965
Micropentila brunnea (Kirby, 1887)
Micropentila catocala Strand, 1914
Micropentila cingulum Druce, 1910
Micropentila dorothea Bethune-Baker, 1903
Micropentila flavopunctata Stempffer & Bennett, 1965
Micropentila fulvula Hawker-Smith, 1933
Micropentila fuscula (Grose-Smith, 1898)
Micropentila galenides (Holland, 1895)
Micropentila subplagata Bethune-Baker, 1915
Micropentila triangularis Aurivillius, 1895
Micropentila ugandae Hawker-Smith, 1933
Pseuderesia eleaza (Hewitson, 1873)
Eresina conradti Stempffer, 1956
Eresina corynetes (Grose-Smith & Kirby, 1890)
Eresina fontainei Stempffer, 1956
Eresina jacksoni Stempffer, 1961
Eresina maesseni Stempffer, 1956
Eresina pseudofusca Stempffer, 1961
Eresina rougeoti Stempffer, 1956
Eresiomera campbelli Collins & Larsen, 1998
Eresiomera clenchi (Stempffer, 1961)
Eresiomera isca (Hewitson, 1873)
Eresiomera magnimacula (Rebel, 1914)
Eresiomera nancy Collins & Larsen, 1998
Eresiomera osheba (Holland, 1890)
Eresiomera ouesso (Stempffer, 1962)
Eresiomera paradoxa (Schultze, 1917)
Eresiomera rougeoti (Stempffer, 1961)
Eresiomera rutilo (Druce, 1910)
Citrinophila bennetti Jackson, 1967
Citrinophila erastus (Hewitson, 1866)
Citrinophila similis (Kirby, 1887)
Citrinophila tenera (Kirby, 1887)
Citrinophila terias Joicey & Talbot, 1921
Argyrocheila bitje Bethune-Baker, 1915
Argyrocheila undifera Staudinger, 1892

Epitolini
Toxochitona gerda (Kirby, 1890)
Iridana exquisita (Grose-Smith, 1898)
Iridana ghanana Stempffer, 1964
Iridana hypocala Eltringham, 1929
Iridana incredibilis (Staudinger, 1891)
Iridana nigeriana Stempffer, 1964
Iridana perdita (Kirby, 1890)
Teratoneura isabellae Dudgeon, 1909
Teratoneura congoensis Stempffer, 1954
Epitola posthumus (Fabricius, 1793)
Epitola urania Kirby, 1887
Epitola uranioides uranoides Libert, 1999
Cerautola adolphifriderici (Schultze, 1911)
Cerautola ceraunia (Hewitson, 1873)
Cerautola crowleyi leucographa Libert, 1999
Cerautola miranda vidua (Talbot, 1935)
Cerautola semibrunnea (Bethune-Baker, 1916)
Cerautola hewitsoni (Mabille, 1877)
Cerautola hewitsonioides (Hawker-Smith, 1933)
Geritola albomaculata (Bethune-Baker, 1903)
Geritola amieti Libert, 1999
Geritola concepcion (Suffert, 1904)
Geritola cyanea (Jackson, 1964)
Geritola daveyi (Roche, 1954)
Geritola dubia (Jackson, 1964)
Geritola gerina (Hewitson, 1878)
Geritola goodii (Holland, 1890)
Geritola jackiana Collins & Libert, 1999
Geritola larae Collins & Libert, 1999
Geritola liana (Roche, 1954)
Geritola mirifica (Jackson, 1964)
Geritola nitide (Druce, 1910)
Geritola nitidica Libert & Collins, 1999
Geritola prouvosti Bouyer & Libert, 1999
Geritola virginea (Bethune-Baker, 1904)
Geritola zelica (Kirby, 1890)
Geritola subargentea continua Libert, 1999
Stempfferia abri Libert & Collins, 1997
Stempfferia carcassoni Jackson, 1962
Stempfferia alba (Jackson, 1962)
Stempfferia annae Libert, 1999
Stempfferia badura (Kirby, 1890)
Stempfferia bouyeri Libert & Collins, 1999
Stempfferia carcina (Hewitson, 1873)
Stempfferia cercene (Hewitson, 1873)
Stempfferia cercenoides (Holland, 1890)
Stempfferia ciconia camerunica Libert, 1999
Stempfferia cinerea (Berger, 1981)
Stempfferia coerulea pierri Libert, 1999
Stempfferia congoana (Aurivillius, 1923)
Stempfferia elissa (Grose-Smith, 1898)
Stempfferia flavoantennata (Roche, 1954)
Stempfferia gordoni (Druce, 1903)
Stempfferia insulana (Aurivillius, 1923)
Stempfferia iturina (Joicey & Talbot, 1921)
Stempfferia jolyana Libert & Bouyer, 1999
Stempfferia liberti (Collins, 1998)
Stempfferia marginata (Kirby, 1887)
Stempfferia michelae centralis Libert, 1999
Stempfferia piersoni Libert & Bouyer, 1999
Stempfferia similis Libert, 1999
Stempfferia tumentia (Druce, 1910)
Stempfferia uniformis (Kirby, 1887)
Stempfferia zelza (Hewitson, 1873)
Cephetola catuna (Kirby, 1890)
Cephetola cephena (Hewitson, 1873)
Cephetola eliasis angustata Libert & Collins, 1999
Cephetola ghesquierei (Roche, 1954)
Cephetola katerae (Jackson, 1962)
Cephetola marci Collins & Libert, 1999
Cephetola mariae Libert, 1999
Cephetola martini (Libert, 1998)
Cephetola mercedes mercedes (Suffert, 1904)
Cephetola mercedes dejeani Libert, 1999
Cephetola nigeriae (Jackson, 1962)
Cephetola nigra (Bethune-Baker, 1903)
Cephetola orientalis (Roche, 1954)
Cephetola ouesso (Jackson, 1962)
Cephetola pinodes budduana (Talbot, 1937)
Cephetola quentini Bouyer & Libert, 1999
Cephetola rileyi (Audeoud, 1936)
Cephetola subcoerulea (Roche, 1954)
Cephetola subgriseata (Jackson, 1964)
Cephetola sublustris (Bethune-Baker, 1904)
Cephetola viridana (Joicey & Talbot, 1921)
Batelusia zebra Druce, 1910
Neaveia lamborni Druce, 1910
Epitolina dispar (Kirby, 1887)
Epitolina melissa (Druce, 1888)
Epitolina collinsi Libert, 2000
Epitolina catori Bethune-Baker, 1904
Epitolina larseni Libert, 2000
Hypophytala benitensis (Holland, 1890)
Hypophytala henleyi (Kirby, 1890)
Hypophytala hyetta (Hewitson, 1873)
Hypophytala hyettoides (Aurivillius, 1895)
Hypophytala reducta (Aurivillius, 1923)
Hypophytala ultramarina Libert & Collins, 1999
Phytala elais Westwood, 1851
Neoepitola barombiensis (Kirby, 1890)
Aethiopana honorius (Fabricius, 1793)
Hewitsonia amieti Bouyer, 1997
Hewitsonia bitjeana Bethune-Baker, 1915
Hewitsonia beryllina Schultze, 1916
Hewitsonia boisduvalii boisduvalii (Hewitson, 1869)
Hewitsonia boisduvalii borealis Schultze, 1916
Hewitsonia congoensis Joicey & Talbot, 1921
Hewitsonia danane Stempffer, 1969
Hewitsonia inexpectata Bouyer, 1997
Hewitsonia kirbyi Dewitz, 1879
Hewitsonia prouvosti Bouyer, 1997
Hewitsonia ugandae jolyana Bouyer, 1997
Powellana cottoni Bethune-Baker, 1908

Aphnaeinae
Pseudaletis agrippina Druce, 1888
Pseudaletis camarensis Collins & Libert, 2007
Pseudaletis abriana Libert, 2007
Pseudaletis bouyeri Collins & Libert, 2007
Pseudaletis michelae Libert, 2007
Pseudaletis melissae Collins & Libert, 2007
Pseudaletis clymenus (Druce, 1885)
Pseudaletis zebra Holland, 1891
Pseudaletis taeniata Libert, 2007
Pseudaletis busoga van Someren, 1939
Pseudaletis antimachus (Staudinger, 1888)
Pseudaletis batesi Druce, 1910
Pseudaletis richardi Stempffer, 1952
Pseudaletis dolieri Collins & Libert, 2007
Pseudaletis arrhon Druce, 1913
Lipaphnaeus aderna (Plötz, 1880)
Lipaphnaeus leonina bitje (Druce, 1910)
Lipaphnaeus leonina paradoxa (Schultze, 1908)
Cigaritis avriko (Karsch, 1893)
Cigaritis crustaria (Holland, 1890)
Cigaritis dufranei (Bouyer, 1991)
Cigaritis homeyeri (Dewitz, 1887)
Cigaritis menelas (Druce, 1907)
Cigaritis nilus (Hewitson, 1865)
Zeritis aurivillii Schultze, 1908
Zeritis neriene Boisduval, 1836
Axiocerses harpax efulena Clench, 1963
Axiocerses callaghani Henning & Henning, 1996
Axiocerses amanga borealis Aurivillius, 1905
Aphnaeus adamsi Stempffer, 1954
Aphnaeus argyrocyclus Holland, 1890
Aphnaeus asterius Plötz, 1880
Aphnaeus chapini occidentalis Clench, 1963
Aphnaeus charboneli Bouyer & Libert, 1996
Aphnaeus gilloni Stempffer, 1966
Aphnaeus herbuloti Stempffer, 1971
Aphnaeus jefferyi Hawker-Smith, 1928
Aphnaeus marci Collins & Larsen, 2008
Aphnaeus liberti Bouyer, 1996
Aphnaeus orcas (Drury, 1782)

Theclinae
Myrina silenus (Fabricius, 1775)
Myrina subornata Lathy, 1903
Oxylides albata (Aurivillius, 1895)
Oxylides faunus camerunica Libert, 2004
Syrmoptera amasa (Hewitson, 1869)
Syrmoptera bonifacei Stempffer, 1961
Syrmoptera melanomitra Karsch, 1895
Dapidodigma demeter Clench, 1961
Dapidodigma hymen (Fabricius, 1775)
Hypolycaena antifaunus (Westwood, 1851)
Hypolycaena clenchi Larsen, 1997
Hypolycaena coerulea Aurivillius, 1895
Hypolycaena dubia Aurivillius, 1895
Hypolycaena hatita Hewitson, 1865
Hypolycaena kadiskos Druce, 1890
Hypolycaena kakumi Larsen, 1997
Hypolycaena lebona (Hewitson, 1865)
Hypolycaena liara Druce, 1890
Hypolycaena naara Hewitson, 1873
Hypolycaena nigra Bethune-Baker, 1914
Hypolycaena scintillans Stempffer, 1957
Iolaus bolissus azureus Clench, 1964
Iolaus eurisus vexillarius Clench, 1964
Iolaus aethes Clench, 1964
Iolaus aethria Karsch, 1893
Iolaus agnes Aurivillius, 1898
Iolaus alienus bicaudatus Aurivillius, 1905
Iolaus aurivillii Röber, 1900
Iolaus bansana Bethune-Baker, 1926
Iolaus bellina bellina (Plötz, 1880)
Iolaus bellina exquisita (Riley, 1928)
Iolaus coelestis Bethune-Baker, 1926
Iolaus creta Hewitson, 1878
Iolaus cytaeis Hewitson, 1875
Iolaus farquharsoni (Bethune-Baker, 1922)
Iolaus flavilinea (Riley, 1928)
Iolaus adorabilis Collins & Larsen, 2008
Iolaus fontainei (Stempffer, 1956)
Iolaus frater kamerunica (Riley, 1928)
Iolaus gemmarius (Druce, 1910)
Iolaus hemicyanus barbara Suffert, 1904
Iolaus iasis Hewitson, 1865
Iolaus maesa (Hewitson, 1862)
Iolaus neavei (Druce, 1910)
Iolaus pollux Aurivillius, 1895
Iolaus sappirus (Druce, 1902)
Iolaus scintillans Aurivillius, 1905
Iolaus sciophilus (Schultze, 1916)
Iolaus sibella (Druce, 1910)
Iolaus menas Druce, 1890
Iolaus schultzei Aurivillius, 1905
Iolaus gabunica gabunica (Riley, 1928)
Iolaus gabunica mbami (Libert, 1993)
Iolaus icipe Collins & Larsen, 1998
Iolaus iulus Hewitson, 1869
Iolaus ismenias (Klug, 1834)
Iolaus christofferi Collins & Larsen, 2003
Iolaus alcibiades Kirby, 1871
Iolaus paneperata Druce, 1890
Iolaus lukabas Druce, 1890
Iolaus calisto (Westwood, 1851)
Iolaus laonides Aurivillius, 1898
Iolaus poecilaon (Riley, 1928)
Iolaus caesareus Aurivillius, 1895
Iolaus manasei (Libert, 1993)
Iolaus timon (Fabricius, 1787)
Iolaus catori Bethune-Baker, 1904
Pilodeudorix mimeta mimeta (Karsch, 1895)
Pilodeudorix mimeta oreas Libert, 2004
Pilodeudorix ula (Karsch, 1895)
Pilodeudorix virgata (Druce, 1891)
Pilodeudorix anetia (Hulstaert, 1924)
Pilodeudorix hamidou Libert, 2004
Pilodeudorix angelita angelita (Suffert, 1904)
Pilodeudorix angelita schultzei (Aurivillius, 1907)
Pilodeudorix aruma (Hewitson, 1873)
Pilodeudorix catori (Bethune-Baker, 1903)
Pilodeudorix kallipygos (Birket-Smith, 1960)
Pilodeudorix leonina dimitris (d'Abrera, 1980)
Pilodeudorix leonina indentata Libert, 2004
Pilodeudorix mera (Hewitson, 1873)
Pilodeudorix otraeda genuba (Hewitson, 1875)
Pilodeudorix camerona (Plötz, 1880)
Pilodeudorix congoana (Aurivillius, 1923)
Pilodeudorix diyllus (Hewitson, 1878)
Pilodeudorix zela (Hewitson, 1869)
Pilodeudorix aucta (Karsch, 1895)
Pilodeudorix hugoi Libert, 2004
Pilodeudorix catalla (Karsch, 1895)
Pilodeudorix corruscans (Aurivillius, 1898)
Pilodeudorix deritas (Hewitson, 1874)
Pilodeudorix kedassa (Druce, 1910)
Pilodeudorix kiellandi (Congdon & Collins, 1998)
Pilodeudorix laticlavia (Clench, 1965)
Pilodeudorix nirmo (Clench, 1965)
Pilodeudorix pasteon (Druce, 1910)
Pilodeudorix pseudoderitas (Stempffer, 1964)
Pilodeudorix sadeska (Clench, 1965)
Pilodeudorix violetta (Aurivillius, 1897)
Paradeudorix cobaltina (Stempffer, 1964)
Paradeudorix eleala (Hewitson, 1865)
Paradeudorix ituri (Bethune-Baker, 1908)
Paradeudorix marginata (Stempffer, 1962)
Paradeudorix petersi (Stempffer & Bennett, 1956)
Hypomyrina mimetica Libert, 2004
Hypomyrina fournierae Gabriel, 1939
Deudorix caliginosa Lathy, 1903
Deudorix dinochares Grose-Smith, 1887
Deudorix dinomenes diomedes Jackson, 1966
Deudorix galathea (Swainson, 1821)
Deudorix kayonza Stempffer, 1956
Deudorix livia (Klug, 1834)
Deudorix lorisona (Hewitson, 1862)
Deudorix odana Druce, 1887
Capys bamendanus Schultze, 1909

Polyommatinae

Lycaenesthini
Anthene abruptus (Gaede, 1915)
Anthene afra (Bethune-Baker, 1910)
Anthene buchholzi (Plötz, 1880)
Anthene crawshayi (Butler, 1899)
Anthene definita (Butler, 1899)
Anthene emkopoti Larsen & Collins, 1998
Anthene flavomaculatus (Grose-Smith & Kirby, 1893)
Anthene irumu (Stempffer, 1948)
Anthene juba (Fabricius, 1787)
Anthene kampala (Bethune-Baker, 1910)
Anthene lachares (Hewitson, 1878)
Anthene larydas (Cramer, 1780)
Anthene leptines (Hewitson, 1874)
Anthene ligures (Hewitson, 1874)
Anthene liodes (Hewitson, 1874)
Anthene locuples (Grose-Smith, 1898)
Anthene lunulata (Trimen, 1894)
Anthene lychnides (Hewitson, 1878)
Anthene lysicles (Hewitson, 1874)
Anthene mahota (Grose-Smith, 1887)
Anthene makala (Bethune-Baker, 1910)
Anthene ngoko Stempffer, 1962
Anthene princeps (Butler, 1876)
Anthene pyroptera (Aurivillius, 1895)
Anthene ramnika d'Abrera, 1980
Anthene rubricinctus (Holland, 1891)
Anthene scintillula (Holland, 1891)
Anthene starki Larsen, 2005
Anthene sylvanus (Drury, 1773)
Anthene versatilis versatilis (Bethune-Baker, 1910)
Anthene versatilis bitje (Druce, 1910)
Anthene wilsoni (Talbot, 1935)
Anthene zenkeri (Karsch, 1895)
Anthene lamprocles (Hewitson, 1878)
Anthene lyzanius (Hewitson, 1874)
Anthene quadricaudata (Bethune-Baker, 1926)
Anthene chryseostictus (Bethune-Baker, 1910)
Anthene fulvus Stempffer, 1962
Anthene gemmifera (Neave, 1910)
Anthene lusones (Hewitson, 1874)
Anthene staudingeri (Grose-Smith & Kirby, 1894)
Anthene africana (Bethune-Baker, 1926)
Anthene coerulea (Aurivillius, 1895)
Anthene fasciatus (Aurivillius, 1895)
Anthene hades (Bethune-Baker, 1910)
Anthene inconspicua (Druce, 1910)
Anthene inferna (Bethune-Baker, 1926)
Anthene lacides (Hewitson, 1874)
Anthene lamias (Hewitson, 1878)
Anthene lucretilis (Hewitson, 1874)
Anthene obscura (Druce, 1910)
Anthene phoenicis (Karsch, 1893)
Anthene rufoplagata (Bethune-Baker, 1910)
Cupidesthes arescopa Bethune-Baker, 1910
Cupidesthes caerulea Jackson, 1966
Cupidesthes leonina (Bethune-Baker, 1903)
Cupidesthes lithas (Druce, 1890)
Cupidesthes mimetica (Druce, 1910)
Cupidesthes paralithas Bethune-Baker, 1926
Cupidesthes pungusei Collins & Larsen, 2005
Cupidesthes robusta Aurivillius, 1895

Polyommatini
Cupidopsis jobates mauritanica Riley, 1932
Pseudonacaduba aethiops (Mabille, 1877)
Pseudonacaduba sichela (Wallengren, 1857)
Lampides boeticus (Linnaeus, 1767)
Uranothauma antinorii bamendanus Libert, 1993
Uranothauma falkensteini (Dewitz, 1879)
Uranothauma frederikkae frederikkae Libert, 1993
Uranothauma frederikkae manengoubensis Libert, 1993
Uranothauma heritsia (Hewitson, 1876)
Uranothauma nubifer (Trimen, 1895)
Phlyaria cyara (Hewitson, 1876)
Cacyreus audeoudi Stempffer, 1936
Cacyreus lingeus (Stoll, 1782)
Leptotes pirithous (Linnaeus, 1767)
Tuxentius carana (Hewitson, 1876)
Tuxentius cretosus nodieri (Oberthür, 1883)
Tuxentius margaritaceus (Sharpe, 1892)
Tarucus legrasi Stempffer, 1948
Tarucus rosacea (Austaut, 1885)
Tarucus theophrastus (Fabricius, 1793)
Tarucus ungemachi Stempffer, 1942
Zizeeria knysna (Trimen, 1862)
Actizera lucida (Trimen, 1883)
Zizula hylax (Fabricius, 1775)
Azanus mirza (Plötz, 1880)
Azanus isis (Drury, 1773)
Eicochrysops dudgeoni Riley, 1929
Eicochrysops hippocrates (Fabricius, 1793)
Eicochrysops sanyere Libert, 1993
Euchrysops albistriata (Capronnier, 1889)
Euchrysops banyo Libert, 2001
Euchrysops barkeri (Trimen, 1893)
Euchrysops cyclopteris (Butler, 1876)
Euchrysops malathana (Boisduval, 1833)
Euchrysops nilotica (Aurivillius, 1904)
Euchrysops reducta Hulstaert, 1924
Euchrysops sagba Libert, 1993
Thermoniphas alberici (Dufrane, 1945)
Thermoniphas bibundana (Grünberg, 1910)
Thermoniphas fumosa Stempffer, 1952
Thermoniphas leucocyanea Clench, 1961
Thermoniphas micylus (Cramer, 1780)
Thermoniphas stempfferi Clench, 1961
Thermoniphas togara (Plötz, 1880)
Oboronia albicosta (Gaede, 1916)
Oboronia guessfeldti (Dewitz, 1879)
Oboronia ornata ornata (Mabille, 1890)
Oboronia ornata vestalis (Aurivillius, 1895)
Oboronia pseudopunctatus (Strand, 1912)
Oboronia punctatus (Dewitz, 1879)
Chilades eleusis (Demaison, 1888)
Lepidochrysops abri Libert & Collins, 2001
Lepidochrysops parsimon (Fabricius, 1775)
Lepidochrysops phoebe Libert, 2001
Lepidochrysops polydialecta (Bethune-Baker, [1923])
Lepidochrysops quassi bernaudi Libert & Collins, 2001
Lepidochrysops ringa Tite, 1959
Lepidochrysops victoriae occidentalis Libert & Collins, 2001

Riodinidae

Nemeobiinae
Abisara tantalus caerulea Carpenter & Jackson, 1950
Abisara intermedia Aurivillius, 1895
Abisara talantus Aurivillius, 1891
Abisara caeca semicaeca Riley, 1932
Abisara rutherfordii rutherfordii Hewitson, 1874
Abisara rutherfordii herwigii Dewitz, 1887
Abisara gerontes gerontes (Fabricius, 1781)
Abisara gerontes gabunica Riley, 1932
Abisara rogersi Druce, 1878
Abisara cameroonensis Callaghan, 2003
Abisara neavei latifasciata Riley, 1932

Nymphalidae

Libytheinae
Libythea labdaca Westwood, 1851

Danainae

Danaini
Danaus chrysippus alcippus (Cramer, 1777)
Tirumala formosa morgeni (Honrath, 1892)
Tirumala petiverana (Doubleday, 1847)
Amauris niavius (Linnaeus, 1758)
Amauris tartarea Mabille, 1876
Amauris albimaculata intermedians Hulstaert, 1926
Amauris crawshayi camerunica Joicey & Talbot, 1925
Amauris damocles (Fabricius, 1793)
Amauris echeria occidentalis Schmidt, 1921
Amauris hecate (Butler, 1866)
Amauris hyalites Butler, 1874
Amauris inferna Butler, 1871
Amauris vashti (Butler, 1869)

Satyrinae

Elymniini
Elymniopsis bammakoo (Westwood, [1851])

Melanitini
Gnophodes betsimena parmeno Doubleday, 1849
Gnophodes chelys (Fabricius, 1793)
Melanitis ansorgei Rothschild, 1904
Melanitis leda (Linnaeus, 1758)
Aphysoneura scapulifascia occidentalis Joicey & Talbot, 1924

Satyrini
Bicyclus amieti Libert, 1996
Bicyclus analis (Aurivillius, 1895)
Bicyclus angulosa (Butler, 1868)
Bicyclus anisops (Karsch, 1892)
Bicyclus auricruda fulgidus Fox, 1963
Bicyclus buea (Strand, 1912)
Bicyclus campus (Karsch, 1893)
Bicyclus dorothea (Cramer, 1779)
Bicyclus dubia (Aurivillius, 1893)
Bicyclus ephorus bergeri Condamin, 1965
Bicyclus evadne elionias (Hewitson, 1866)
Bicyclus ewondo Libert, 1996
Bicyclus golo (Aurivillius, 1893)
Bicyclus graueri choveti Libert, 1996
Bicyclus hewitsoni (Doumet, 1861)
Bicyclus howarthi Condamin, 1963
Bicyclus hyperanthus (Bethune-Baker, 1908)
Bicyclus iccius (Hewitson, 1865)
Bicyclus ignobilis eurini Condamin & Fox, 1963
Bicyclus istaris (Plötz, 1880)
Bicyclus italus (Hewitson, 1865)
Bicyclus madetes madetes (Hewitson, 1874)
Bicyclus madetes carola d'Abrera, 1980
Bicyclus mandanes Hewitson, 1873
Bicyclus medontias (Hewitson, 1873)
Bicyclus mesogena (Karsch, 1894)
Bicyclus mollitia (Karsch, 1895)
Bicyclus nachtetis Condamin, 1965
Bicyclus nobilis (Aurivillius, 1893)
Bicyclus pavonis (Butler, 1876)
Bicyclus procora (Karsch, 1893)
Bicyclus rhacotis (Hewitson, 1866)
Bicyclus rileyi Condamin, 1961
Bicyclus safitza (Westwood, 1850)
Bicyclus sambulos (Hewitson, 1877)
Bicyclus martius sanaos (Hewitson, 1866)
Bicyclus sandace (Hewitson, 1877)
Bicyclus sangmelinae Condamin, 1963
Bicyclus saussurei camerunia (Strand, 1914)
Bicyclus sciathis (Hewitson, 1866)
Bicyclus sebetus (Hewitson, 1877)
Bicyclus smithi (Aurivillius, 1899)
Bicyclus sophrosyne (Plötz, 1880)
Bicyclus sweadneri Fox, 1963
Bicyclus sylvicolus Condamin, 1965
Bicyclus taenias (Hewitson, 1877)
Bicyclus technatis (Hewitson, 1877)
Bicyclus trilophus trilophus (Rebel, 1914)
Bicyclus trilophus jacksoni Condamin, 1961
Bicyclus vulgaris (Butler, 1868)
Bicyclus xeneas (Hewitson, 1866)
Bicyclus xeneoides Condamin, 1961
Hallelesis asochis asochis (Hewitson, 1866)
Hallelesis asochis congoensis (Joicey & Talbot, 1921)
Heteropsis perspicua camerounica (Kielland, 1994)
Heteropsis peitho (Plötz, 1880)
Heteropsis nigrescens striata (Libert, 2006)
Ypthima albida occidentalis Bartel, 1905
Ypthima condamini nigeriae Kielland, 1982
Ypthima doleta Kirby, 1880
Ypthima impura Elwes & Edwards, 1893
Ypthima lamto Kielland, 1982
Ypthima pupillaris Butler, 1888
Ypthima vuattouxi Kielland, 1982

Charaxinae

Charaxini
Charaxes varanes vologeses (Mabille, 1876)
Charaxes fulvescens (Aurivillius, 1891)
Charaxes obudoensis van Someren, 1969
Charaxes candiope (Godart, 1824)
Charaxes protoclea protonothodes van Someren, 1971
Charaxes boueti Feisthamel, 1850
Charaxes cynthia kinduana Le Cerf, 1923
Charaxes lucretius intermedius van Someren, 1971
Charaxes lactetinctus Karsch, 1892
Charaxes jasius Poulton, 1926
Charaxes epijasius Reiche, 1850
Charaxes castor (Cramer, 1775)
Charaxes brutus angustus Rothschild, 1900
Charaxes pollux (Cramer, 1775)
Charaxes tectonis tectonis Jordan, 1937
Charaxes tectonis nebularum Darge, 1977
Charaxes eudoxus mechowi Rothschild, 1900
Charaxes musakensis Darge, 1973
Charaxes richelmanni Röber, 1936
Charaxes numenes aequatorialis van Someren, 1972
Charaxes tiridates tiridatinus Röber, 1936
Charaxes bipunctatus ugandensis van Someren, 1972
Charaxes mixtus Rothschild, 1894
Charaxes smaragdalis Butler, 1866
Charaxes xiphares wernickei Joicey & Talbot, 1927
Charaxes imperialis albipuncta Joicey & Talbot, 1920
Charaxes ameliae Doumet, 1861
Charaxes pythodoris occidens van Someren, 1963
Charaxes hadrianus Ward, 1871
Charaxes lecerfi Lathy, 192
Charaxes nobilis Druce, 1873
Charaxes superbus Schultze, 1909
Charaxes lydiae Holland, 1917
Charaxes acraeoides Druce, 1908
Charaxes fournierae Le Moult, 1930
Charaxes zingha (Stoll, 1780)
Charaxes etesipe (Godart, 1824)
Charaxes achaemenes monticola van Someren, 1970
Charaxes eupale latimargo Joicey & Talbot, 1921
Charaxes subornatus Schultze, 1916
Charaxes anticlea proadusta van Someren, 1971
Charaxes thysi Capronnier, 1889
Charaxes taverniersi Berger, 1975
Charaxes hildebrandti (Dewitz, 1879)
Charaxes virilis van Someren & Jackson, 1952
Charaxes catachrous van Someren & Jackson, 1952
Charaxes etheocles ochracea van Someren & Jackson, 1957
Charaxes cedreatis Hewitson, 1874
Charaxes viola viola Butler, 1866
Charaxes viola picta van Someren & Jackson, 1952
Charaxes kheili Staudinger, 1896
Charaxes pleione congoensis Plantrou, 1989
Charaxes paphianus paphianus Ward, 1871
Charaxes paphianus falcata (Butler, 1872)
Charaxes kahldeni Homeyer & Dewitz, 1882
Charaxes nichetes nichetes Grose-Smith, 1883
Charaxes nichetes leopardinus Plantrou, 1974
Charaxes lycurgus bernardiana Plantrou, 1978
Charaxes zelica rougeoti Plantrou, 1978
Charaxes porthos Grose-Smith, 1883
Charaxes doubledayi Aurivillius, 1899
Charaxes mycerina nausicaa Staudinger, 1891
Charaxes dubiosus Röber, 1936

Euxanthini
Charaxes eurinome eurinome (Cramer, 1775)
Charaxes eurinome ansellica (Butler, 1870)
Charaxes crossleyi (Ward, 1871)
Charaxes trajanus (Ward, 1871)

Pallini
Palla publius centralis van Someren, 1975
Palla ussheri dobelli (Hall, 1919)
Palla decius (Cramer, 1777)
Palla violinitens coniger (Butler, 1896)

Apaturinae
Apaturopsis cleochares (Hewitson, 1873)

Nymphalinae
Kallimoides rumia jadyae (Fox, 1968)
Vanessula milca buechneri Dewitz, 1887

Nymphalini
Antanartia delius (Drury, 1782)
Vanessa dimorphica mortoni (Howarth, 1966)
Junonia africana (Richelmann, 1913)
Junonia oenone (Linnaeus, 1758)
Junonia schmiedeli (Fiedler, 1920)
Junonia sophia (Fabricius, 1793)
Junonia stygia (Aurivillius, 1894)
Junonia gregorii Butler, 1896
Junonia terea (Drury, 1773)
Junonia westermanni Westwood, 1870
Junonia ansorgei (Rothschild, 1899)
Junonia cymodoce lugens (Schultze, 1912)
Salamis cacta (Fabricius, 1793)
Protogoniomorpha parhassus (Drury, 1782)
Protogoniomorpha temora (Felder & Felder, 1867)
Precis ceryne ceruana Rothschild & Jordan, 190
Precis coelestina Dewitz, 1879
Precis milonia Felder & Felder, 1867
Precis octavia (Cramer, 1777)
Precis rauana silvicola Schultz, 1916
Precis sinuata Plötz, 1880
Hypolimnas anthedon (Doubleday, 1845)
Hypolimnas bartelotti Grose-Smith, 1890
Hypolimnas chapmani (Hewitson, 1873)
Hypolimnas dinarcha (Hewitson, 1865)
Hypolimnas mechowi (Dewitz, 1884)
Hypolimnas misippus (Linnaeus, 1764)
Hypolimnas monteironis (Druce, 1874)
Hypolimnas salmacis (Drury, 1773)
Catacroptera cloanthe ligata Rothschild & Jordan, 1903

Cyrestinae

Cyrestini
Cyrestis camillus (Fabricius, 1781)

Biblidinae

Biblidini
Byblia anvatara crameri Aurivillius, 1894
Mesoxantha ethosea ethoseoides Rebel, 1914
Ariadne actisanes (Hewitson, 1875)
Ariadne albifascia (Joicey & Talbot, 1921)
Ariadne enotrea enotrea (Cramer, 1779)
Ariadne enotrea suffusa (Joicey & Talbot, 1921)
Ariadne pagenstecheri (Suffert, 1904)
Ariadne personata (Joicey & Talbot, 1921)
Neptidopsis ophione (Cramer, 1777)
Eurytela alinda Mabille, 1893
Eurytela dryope (Cramer, [1775])
Eurytela hiarbas (Drury, 1782)

Epicaliini
Sevenia amulia (Cramer, 1777)
Sevenia boisduvali omissa (Rothschild, 1918)
Sevenia garega (Karsch, 1892)
Sevenia occidentalium (Mabille, 1876)
Sevenia pechueli sangbae (Hecq & Peeters, 1992)
Sevenia silvicola (Schultze, 1917)
Sevenia trimeni major (Rothschild, 1918)
Sevenia umbrina (Karsch, 1892)

Limenitinae

Limenitidini
Harma theobene superna (Fox, 1968)
Cymothoe alticola Libert & Collins, 1997
Cymothoe altisidora (Hewitson, 1869)
Cymothoe amenides (Hewitson, 1874)
Cymothoe anitorgis (Hewitson, 1874)
Cymothoe aramis (Hewitson, 1865)
Cymothoe beckeri (Herrich-Schaeffer, 1858)
Cymothoe caenis (Drury, 1773)
Cymothoe capella (Ward, 1871)
Cymothoe coccinata (Hewitson, 1874)
Cymothoe consanguis Aurivillius, 1896
Cymothoe crocea Schultze, 1917
Cymothoe cyclades (Ward, 1871)
Cymothoe distincta Overlaet, 1944
Cymothoe confusa Aurivillius, 1887
Cymothoe megaesta Staudinger, 1890
Cymothoe euthalioides Kirby, 1889
Cymothoe excelsa Neustetter, 1912
Cymothoe fontainei debauchei Overlaet, 1952
Cymothoe fumana balluca Fox & Howarth, 1968
Cymothoe haimodia (Grose-Smith, 1887)
Cymothoe harmilla kraepelini Schultze, 1912
Cymothoe haynae diphyia Karsch, 1894
Cymothoe haynae superba Aurivillius, 1899
Cymothoe heliada (Hewitson, 1874)
Cymothoe herminia (Grose-Smith, 1887)
Cymothoe hesiodina Schultze, 1908
Cymothoe hesiodotus Staudinger, 1890
Cymothoe hyarbita (Hewitson, 1866)
Cymothoe indamora (Hewitson, 1866)
Cymothoe jodutta ciceronis (Ward, 1871)
Cymothoe lucasii binotorum Darge, 1985
Cymothoe lurida hesione Weymer, 1907
Cymothoe oemilius (Doumet, 1859)
Cymothoe ogova (Plötz, 1880)
Cymothoe orphnina suavis Schultze, 1913
Cymothoe preussi Staudinger, 1890
Cymothoe radialis Gaede, 1916
Cymothoe rebeli Neustetter, 1912
Cymothoe reginaeelisabethae belgarum Overlaet, 1952
Cymothoe reinholdi (Plötz, 1880)
Cymothoe sangaris (Godart, 1824)
Cymothoe weymeri Suffert, 1904
Cymothoe zenkeri Richelmann, 1913
Pseudoneptis bugandensis ianthe Hemming, 1964
Pseudacraea annakae Knoop, 1988
Pseudacraea boisduvalii (Doubleday, 1845)
Pseudacraea clarkii Butler & Rothschild, 1892
Pseudacraea dolomena (Hewitson, 1865)
Pseudacraea rubrobasalis Aurivillius, 1903
Pseudacraea eurytus (Linnaeus, 1758)
Pseudacraea kuenowii gottbergi Dewitz, 1884
Pseudacraea lucretia lucretia (Cramer, [1775])
Pseudacraea lucretia protracta (Butler, 1874)
Pseudacraea semire (Cramer, 1779)
Pseudacraea warburgi Aurivillius, 1892

Neptidini
Neptis agouale Pierre-Baltus, 1978
Neptis alta Overlaet, 1955
Neptis biafra Ward, 1871
Neptis camarensis Schultze, 1920
Neptis claude Collins & Larsen, 2005
Neptis conspicua Neave, 1904
Neptis constantiae kaumba Condamin, 1966
Neptis continuata Holland, 1892
Neptis dentifera Schultze, 1920
Neptis exaleuca Karsch, 1894
Neptis infusa Birket-Smith, 1960
Neptis jamesoni Godman & Salvin, 1890
Neptis kiriakoffi Overlaet, 1955
Neptis liberti Pierre & Pierre-Baltus, 1998
Neptis matilei Pierre-Balthus, 20
Neptis melicerta (Drury, 1773)
Neptis metanira Holland, 1892
Neptis mixophyes Holland, 1892
Neptis morosa Overlaet, 1955
Neptis nebrodes Hewitson, 1874
Neptis nemetes nemetes Hewitson, 1868
Neptis nemetes margueriteae Fox, 1968
Neptis nicobule Holland, 1892
Neptis nicomedes Hewitson, 1874
Neptis quintilla Mabille, 1890
Neptis nicoteles Hewitson, 1874
Neptis nysiades Hewitson, 1868
Neptis strigata Pierre-Baltus, 2007
Neptis occidentalis batesii Hall, 1930
Neptis ochracea mildbraedi Gaede, 1915
Neptis puella Aurivillius, 1894
Neptis saclava marpessa Hopffer, 1855
Neptis seeldrayersi Aurivillius, 1895
Neptis serena Overlaet, 1955
Neptis strigata Aurivillius, 1894
Neptis trigonophora melicertula Strand, 1912
Neptis troundi Pierre-Baltus, 1978

Adoliadini
Catuna angustatum (Felder & Felder, 1867)
Catuna crithea (Drury, 1773)
Catuna niji Fox, 1965
Catuna oberthueri Karsch, 1894
Euryphura athymoides Berger, 1981
Euryphura chalcis (Felder & Felder, 1860)
Euryphura isuka Stoneham, 1935
Euryphura plautilla (Hewitson, 1865)
Euryphura porphyrion (Ward, 1871)
Euryphura togoensis Suffert, 1904
Euryphaedra thauma Staudinger, 1891
Harmilla elegans Aurivillius, 1892
Pseudargynnis hegemone (Godart, 1819)
Aterica galene galene (Brown, 1776)
Aterica galene extensa Heron, 1909
Cynandra opis opis (Drury, 1773)
Cynandra opis bernardii Lagnel, 1967
Euriphene amieti Collins & Larsen, 1997
Euriphene anaxibia Hecq, 1997
Euriphene hecqui Collins & Larsen, 1997
Euriphene abasa (Hewitson, 1866)
Euriphene amaranta (Karsch, 1894)
Euriphene amicia (Hewitson, 1871)
Euriphene aridatha aridatha (Hewitson, 1866)
Euriphene aridatha camerunica d'Abrera, 2004
Euriphene atossa (Hewitson, 1865)
Euriphene atropurpurea (Aurivillius, 1894)
Euriphene atrovirens (Mabille, 1878)
Euriphene aurivillii (Bartel, 1905)
Euriphene barombina (Aurivillius, 1894)
Euriphene batesana Bethune-Baker, 1926
Euriphene camarensis (Ward, 1871)
Euriphene conjungens (Aurivillius, 1909)
Euriphene duseni duseni (Aurivillius, 1892)
Euriphene duseni legeriana Hecq, 1987
Euriphene ernestibaumanni (Karsch, 1895)
Euriphene gambiae gabonica Bernardi, 1966
Euriphene glaucopis (Gaede, 1916)
Euriphene goniogramma (Karsch, 1894)
Euriphene grosesmithi (Staudinger, 1891)
Euriphene incerta (Aurivillius, 1912)
Euriphene karschi (Aurivillius, 1894)
Euriphene luteostriata (Bethune-Baker, 1908)
Euriphene milnei (Hewitson, 1865)
Euriphene minkoi collinsi Hecq, 1994
Euriphene mundula (Grünberg, 1910)
Euriphene niepelti Neustetter, 1916
Euriphene obani Wojtusiak & Knoop, 1994
Euriphene obsoleta (Grünberg, 1908)
Euriphene obtusangula (Aurivillius, 1912)
Euriphene pavo (Howarth, 1959)
Euriphene plagiata (Aurivillius, 1897)
Euriphene rectangula (Schultze, 1920)
Euriphene regula Hecq, 1994
Euriphene schultzei (Aurivillius, 1909)
Euriphene bernaudi Hecq, 1994
Euriphene tadema (Hewitson, 1866)
Euriphene tessmanniana (Bryk, 1915)
Euriphene doriclea (Drury, 1782)
Euriphene lysandra (Stoll, 1790)
Euriphene paralysandra d'Abrera, 2004
Bebearia subtentyris subtentyris (Strand, 1912)
Bebearia subtentyris phoebeensis Hecq, 1996
Bebearia languida (Schultze, 1920)
Bebearia tentyris (Hewitson, 1866)
Bebearia carshena (Hewitson, 1871)
Bebearia absolon (Fabricius, 1793)
Bebearia micans (Aurivillius, 1899)
Bebearia zonara (Butler, 1871)
Bebearia mandinga (Felder & Felder, 1860)
Bebearia oxione squalida (Talbot, 1928)
Bebearia abesa (Hewitson, 1869)
Bebearia partita (Aurivillius, 1895)
Bebearia barce maculata (Aurivillius, 1912)
Bebearia comus (Ward, 1871)
Bebearia mardania (Fabricius, 1793)
Bebearia cocalioides hecqi Holmes, 2001
Bebearia guineensis (Felder & Felder, 1867)
Bebearia cocalia katera (van Someren, 1939)
Bebearia paludicola Holmes, 2001
Bebearia sophus (Fabricius, 1793)
Bebearia staudingeri (Aurivillius, 1893)
Bebearia plistonax (Hewitson, 1874)
Bebearia elpinice (Hewitson, 1869)
Bebearia brunhilda (Kirby, 1889)
Bebearia congolensis (Capronnier, 1889)
Bebearia occitana Hecq, 1989
Bebearia severini (Aurivillius, 1897)
Bebearia phranza (Hewitson, 1865)
Bebearia laetitia (Plötz, 1880)
Bebearia flaminia (Staudinger, 1891)
Bebearia maximiana (Staudinger, 1891)
Bebearia omo Larsen & Warren, 2005
Bebearia nivaria (Ward, 1871)
Bebearia phantasia phantasia (Hewitson, 1865)
Bebearia phantasia concolor Hecq, 1988
Bebearia phantasiella (Staudinger, 1891)
Bebearia demetra obsolescens (Talbot, 1928)
Bebearia maledicta (Strand, 1912)
Bebearia tessmanni (Grünberg, 1910)
Bebearia cutteri cognata (Grünberg, 1910)
Bebearia innocua (Grose-Smith & Kirby, 1889)
Bebearia eliensis eliensis (Hewitson, 1866)
Bebearia eliensis scrutata Hecq, 1989
Bebearia barombina (Staudinger, 1896)
Bebearia octogramma (Grose-Smith & Kirby, 1889)
Bebearia amieti Hecq, 1994
Bebearia bioculata Hecq, 1998
Bebearia bouyeri van de Weghe, 2007
Bebearia chilonis (Hewitson, 1874)
Bebearia defluera Hecq, 1998
Bebearia discors Hecq, 1994
Bebearia ducarmei Hecq, 1987
Bebearia fontaineana intersecta Hecq, 1990
Bebearia fontaineana vinula Hecq, 1987
Bebearia intermedia (Bartel, 1905)
Bebearia jolyana Hecq, 1989
Bebearia liberti Hecq, 1998
Bebearia makala bosmansi Hecq, 1989
Bebearia peetersi Hecq, 1994
Bebearia raeveli Hecq, 1989
Euphaedra rubrocostata (Aurivillius, 1897)
Euphaedra adolfifriderici Schultze, 1920
Euphaedra luperca (Hewitson, 1864)
Euphaedra fucora Hecq, 1979
Euphaedra luteofasciata Hecq, 1979
Euphaedra imperialis imperialis Lindemans, 1910
Euphaedra imperialis gabonica Rothschild, 1918
Euphaedra imperialis hecqui Darge, 1974
Euphaedra medon medon (Linnaeus, 1763)
Euphaedra medon neustetteri Niepelt, 1915
Euphaedra extensa Hecq, 1981
Euphaedra calliope calliope Hecq, 1981
Euphaedra calliope aurichalca Hecq, 1981
Euphaedra zaddachii zaddachii Dewitz, 1879
Euphaedra zaddachii elephantina Staudinger, 1891
Euphaedra mondahensis van de Weghe, Oremans & Hecq, 2005
Euphaedra xypete (Hewitson, 1865)
Euphaedra hewitsoni hewitsoni Hecq, 1974
Euphaedra hewitsoni sumptuosa Hecq, 1974
Euphaedra acuta Hecq, 1977
Euphaedra maxima Holland, 1920
Euphaedra dargei Hecq, 1975
Euphaedra brevis Hecq, 1977
Euphaedra karschi Bartel, 1905
Euphaedra pervaga Hecq, 1996
Euphaedra hollandi Hecq, 1974
Euphaedra diffusa Gaede, 1916
Euphaedra ansorgei Rothschild, 1918
Euphaedra imitans Holland, 1893
Euphaedra cyparissa aurata Carpenter, 1895
Euphaedra cyparissa nominalina Pyrcz & Knoop, 2013
Euphaedra sarcoptera cyparissoides Hecq, 1979
Euphaedra themis (Hübner, 1807)
Euphaedra laboureana bernaudi Hecq, 1996
Euphaedra permixtum permixtum (Butler, 1873)
Euphaedra permixtum diva Hecq, 1982
Euphaedra aureola Kirby, 1889
Euphaedra exerrata Hecq, 1982
Euphaedra janetta (Butler, 1871)
Euphaedra splendens Hecq, 1992
Euphaedra stellata Hecq, 1991
Euphaedra justicia Staudinger, 1886
Euphaedra appositiva Hecq, 1982
Euphaedra adonina adonina (Hewitson, 1865)
Euphaedra adonina spectacularis Hecq, 1997
Euphaedra adonina prasina Hecq, 1991
Euphaedra piriformis Hecq, 1982
Euphaedra uniformis Berger, 1981
Euphaedra controversa Hecq, 1997
Euphaedra ceres electra Hecq, 1983
Euphaedra sarita (Sharpe, 1891)
Euphaedra viridicaerulea Bartel, 1905
Euphaedra ravola (Hewitson, 1866)
Euphaedra margaritifera Schultze, 1920
Euphaedra preussiana preussiana Gaede, 1916
Euphaedra preussiana protea Hecq, 1983
Euphaedra cottoni Sharpe, 1907
Euphaedra rezia (Hewitson, 1866)
Euphaedra proserpina proserpina Hecq, 1983
Euphaedra proserpina tisiphona Hecq, 1983
Euphaedra persephona Hecq, 1983
Euphaedra dargeana Hecq, 1980
Euphaedra demeter Hecq, 1983
Euphaedra velutina Hecq, 1997
Euphaedra subprotea Hecq, 1986
Euphaedra densamacula Hecq, 1997
Euphaedra compacta Hecq, 1997
Euphaedra preussi Staudinger, 1891
Euphaedra vicina Hecq, 1984
Euphaedra fulvofasciata Hecq, 1984
Euphaedra fascinata Hecq, 1984
Euphaedra ochrovirens Hecq, 1984
Euphaedra miranda Hecq, 1984
Euphaedra eleus (Drury, 1782)
Euphaedra simplex Hecq, 1978
Euphaedra alacris Hecq, 1978
Euphaedra amieti Hecq, 1993
Euphaedra ferruginea Staudinger, 1886
Euphaedra semipreussiana Hecq, 1993
Euphaedra bouyeri Hecq, 1993
Euphaedra castanoides Hecq, 1985
Euphaedra edwardsii (van der Hoeven, 1845)
Euphaedra ruspina (Hewitson, 1865)
Euphaedra harpalyce harpalyce (Cramer, 1777)
Euphaedra harpalyce spatiosa (Mabille, 1876)
Euphaedra losinga wardi (Druce, 1874)
Euphaedra viridirupta Hecq, 2007
Euphaedra opulenta Hecq & Van de Weghe, 2005
Euphaedra mambili Hecq, 2001
Euphaedra sardetta Berger, 1981
Euphaedra vulnerata Schultze, 1916
Euptera amieti Collins & Libert, 1998
Euptera aurantiaca Amiet, 1998
Euptera choveti Amiet & Collins, 1998
Euptera crowleyi crowleyi (Kirby, 1889)
Euptera crowleyi centralis Libert, 1995
Euptera elabontas (Hewitson, 1871)
Euptera falsathyma Schultze, 1916
Euptera freyja inexpectata Chovet, 1998
Euptera freyja ornata Libert, 1998
Euptera hirundo Staudinger, 1891
Euptera intricata Aurivillius, 1894
Euptera liberti Collins, 1987
Euptera mimetica Collins & Amiet, 1998
Euptera mirifica Carpenter & Jackson, 1950
Euptera mocquerysi Staudinger, 1893
Euptera neptunus Joicey & Talbot, 1924
Euptera plantroui Chovet & Collins, 1998
Euptera pluto (Ward, 1873)
Euptera richelmanni Weymer, 1907
Euptera schultzei Libert & Chovet, 1998
Euptera semirufa Joicey & Talbot, 1921
Pseudathyma callina (Grose-Smith, 1898)
Pseudathyma cyrili Chovet, 2002
Pseudathyma endjami Libert, 2002
Pseudathyma michelae Libert, 2002
Pseudathyma neptidina Karsch, 1894

Heliconiinae

Acraeini
Acraea kraka Aurivillius, 1893
Acraea admatha Hewitson, 1865
Acraea camaena (Drury, 1773)
Acraea endoscota Le Doux, 1928
Acraea eugenia ochreata Grünberg, 1910
Acraea leucographa Ribbe, 1889
Acraea neobule Doubleday, 1847
Acraea quirina (Fabricius, 1781)
Acraea zetes (Linnaeus, 1758)
Acraea abdera Hewitson, 1852
Acraea cepheus (Linnaeus, 1758)
Acraea egina (Cramer, 1775)
Acraea pseudegina Westwood, 1852
Acraea rogersi Hewitson, 1873
Acraea sykesi Sharpe, 1902
Acraea alcinoe camerunica (Aurivillius, 1893)
Acraea consanguinea (Aurivillius, 1893)
Acraea elongata (Butler, 1874)
Acraea epaea (Cramer, 1779)
Acraea epiprotea (Butler, 1874)
Acraea excisa (Butler, 1874)
Acraea formosa (Butler, 1874)
Acraea indentata (Butler, 1895)
Acraea leopoldina macrosticha (Bethune-Baker, 1908)
Acraea macarista latefasciata (Suffert, 1904)
Acraea obliqua (Aurivillius, 1913)
Acraea tellus (Aurivillius, 1893)
Acraea umbra umbra (Drury, 1782)
Acraea umbra macarioides (Aurivillius, 1893)
Acraea vestalis stavelia (Suffert, 1904)
Acraea acerata Hewitson, 1874
Acraea alciope Hewitson, 1852
Acraea althoffi bitjana Bethune-Baker, 1926
Acraea aurivillii Staudinger, 1896
Acraea bonasia (Fabricius, 1775)
Acraea buschbecki Dewitz, 1889
Acraea circeis (Drury, 1782)
Acraea encedon (Linnaeus, 1758)
Acraea serena (Fabricius, 1775)
Acraea iturina Grose-Smith, 1890
Acraea jodutta (Fabricius, 1793)
Acraea lumiri Bethune-Baker, 1908
Acraea lycoa Godart, 1819
Acraea oberthueri Butler, 1895
Acraea orestia Hewitson, 1874
Acraea pelopeia Staudinger, 1896
Acraea peneleos peneleos Ward, 1871
Acraea peneleos pelasgius Grose-Smith, 1900
Acraea pentapolis Ward, 1871
Acraea polis Pierre, 1999
Acraea pharsalus Ward, 1871
Acraea karschi Aurivillius, 1899
Acraea uvui balina Karsch, 1892
Acraea vesperalis Grose-Smith, 1890
Acraea viviana Staudinger, 1896
Acraea wigginsi occidentalis Bethune-Baker, 1926
Acraea alticola Schultze, 1923
Acraea oreas oboti Collins & Larsen, 2000
Acraea orina Hewitson, 1874
Acraea orinata Oberthür, 1893
Acraea parrhasia parrhasia (Fabricius, 1793)
Acraea parrhasia servona Godart, 1819
Acraea penelope Staudinger, 1896
Acraea translucida Eltringham, 1912
Acraea perenna Doubleday, 1847
Acraea semivitrea Aurivillius, 1895
Acraea simulator Ackery, 1995

Argynnini
Issoria baumanni excelsior (Butler, 1896)

Vagrantini
Lachnoptera anticlia (Hübner, 1819)
Phalanta eurytis (Doubleday, 1847)
Phalanta phalantha aethiopica (Rothschild & Jordan, 1903)

Hesperiidae

Coeliadinae
Coeliades bixana Evans, 1940
Coeliades chalybe (Westwood, 1852)
Coeliades forestan (Stoll, [1782])
Coeliades hanno (Plötz, 1879)
Coeliades libeon (Druce, 1875)
Coeliades pisistratus (Fabricius, 1793)
Pyrrhochalcia iphis (Drury, 1773)

Pyrginae

Celaenorrhinini
Loxolexis dimidia (Holland, 1896)
Loxolexis hollandi (Druce, 1909)
Loxolexis drucei (Larsen, 2002)
Loxolexis holocausta (Mabille, 1891)
Katreus johnstoni (Butler, 1888)
Celaenorrhinus bakolo Miller, 1964
Celaenorrhinus bettoni Butler, 1902
Celaenorrhinus boadicea (Hewitson, 1877)
Celaenorrhinus chrysoglossa (Mabille, 1891)
Celaenorrhinus dargei Berger, 1976
Celaenorrhinus galenus (Fabricius, 1793)
Celaenorrhinus homeyeri (Plötz, 1880)
Celaenorrhinus illustris (Mabille, 1891)
Celaenorrhinus intermixtus Aurivillius, 1896
Celaenorrhinus meditrina (Hewitson, 1877)
Celaenorrhinus milleri Collins & Larsen, 2003
Celaenorrhinus nigropunctata netta Evans, 1937
Celaenorrhinus ovalis Evans, 1937
Celaenorrhinus perlustris mona Evans, 1937
Celaenorrhinus plagiatus Berger, 1976
Celaenorrhinus pooanus Aurivillius, 1910
Celaenorrhinus proxima proxima (Mabille, 1877)
Celaenorrhinus proxima maesseni Berger, 1976
Celaenorrhinus rutilans (Mabille, 1877)
Eretis camerona Evans, 1937
Eretis lugens (Rogenhofer, 1891)
Eretis melania Mabille, 1891
Eretis vaga Evans, 1937
Sarangesa bouvieri (Mabille, 1877)
Sarangesa brigida brigida (Plötz, 1879)
Sarangesa brigida sanaga Miller, 1964
Sarangesa maculata (Mabille, 1891)
Sarangesa majorella (Mabille, 1891)
Sarangesa tertullianus (Fabricius, 1793)
Sarangesa thecla (Plötz, 1879)
Sarangesa tricerata (Mabille, 1891)

Tagiadini
Tagiades flesus (Fabricius, 1781)
Eagris decastigma decastigma Mabille, 1891
Eagris decastigma fuscosa (Holland, 1893)
Eagris denuba (Plötz, 1879)
Eagris hereus hereus (Druce, 1875)
Eagris hereus quaterna (Mabille, 1890)
Eagris lucetia (Hewitson, 1875)
Eagris subalbida (Holland, 1893)
Eagris tetrastigma (Mabille, 1891)
Eagris tigris liberti Collins & Larsen, 2005
Calleagris lacteus (Mabille, 1877)
Calleagris landbecki (Druce, 1910)
Procampta rara Holland, 1892
Netrobalane canopus (Trimen, 1864)
Abantis bismarcki Karsch, 1892
Abantis contigua Evans, 1937
Abantis efulensis Holland, 1896
Abantis elegantula (Mabille, 1890)
Abantis eltringhami Jordan, 1932
Abantis ja Druce, 1909
Abantis leucogaster (Mabille, 1890)
Abantis lucretia Druce, 1909
Abantis rubra Holland, 1920

Carcharodini
Spialia ploetzi (Aurivillius, 1891)

Hesperiinae

Aeromachini
Astictopterus abjecta (Snellen, 1872)
Astictopterus punctulata (Butler, 1895)
Prosopalpus debilis (Plötz, 1879)
Prosopalpus saga Evans, 1937
Prosopalpus styla Evans, 1937
Kedestes callicles (Hewitson, 1868)
Kedestes protensa Butler, 1901
Gorgyra aburae (Plötz, 1879)
Gorgyra afikpo Druce, 1909
Gorgyra aretina (Hewitson, 1878)
Gorgyra bibulus Riley, 1929
Gorgyra bina Evans, 1937
Gorgyra warreni Collins & Larsen, 2008
Gorgyra diversata Evans, 1937
Gorgyra heterochrus (Mabille, 1890)
Gorgyra kalinzu Evans, 1949
Gorgyra minima Holland, 1896
Gorgyra mocquerysii Holland, 1896
Gorgyra pali Evans, 1937
Gorgyra rubescens Holland, 1896
Gorgyra sara Evans, 1937
Gorgyra sola Evans, 1937
Gyrogra subnotata (Holland, 1894)
Teniorhinus ignita (Mabille, 1877)
Teniorhinus watsoni Holland, 1892
Teniorhinus niger (Druce, 1910)
Ceratrichia argyrosticta (Plötz, 1879)
Ceratrichia aurea Druce, 1910
Ceratrichia brunnea ialemia Druce, 1909
Ceratrichia clara clara Evans, 1937
Ceratrichia clara medea Evans, 1937
Ceratrichia flava Hewitson, 1878
Ceratrichia nothus makomensis Strand, 1913
Ceratrichia phocion phocion (Fabricius, 1781)
Ceratrichia phocion camerona Miller, 1971
Ceratrichia punctata Holland, 1896
Ceratrichia semilutea Mabille, 1891
Ceratrichia weberi Miller, 1964
Ceratrichia wollastoni Heron, 1909
Pardaleodes bule Holland, 1896
Pardaleodes edipus (Stoll, 1781)
Pardaleodes fan (Holland, 1894)
Pardaleodes incerta murcia (Plötz, 1883)
Pardaleodes sator sator (Westwood, 1852)
Pardaleodes sator pusiella Mabille, 1877
Pardaleodes tibullus (Fabricius, 1793)
Pardaleodes xanthopeplus Holland, 1892
Xanthodisca astrape (Holland, 1892)
Xanthodisca rega (Mabille, 1890)
Xanthodisca vibius (Hewitson, 1878)
Acada annulifer (Holland, 1892)
Rhabdomantis galatia (Hewitson, 1868)
Rhabdomantis sosia (Mabille, 1891)
Osmodes adon (Mabille, 1890)
Osmodes adonia Evans, 1937
Osmodes adosus (Mabille, 1890)
Osmodes costatus Aurivillius, 1896
Osmodes distincta Holland, 1896
Osmodes hollandi Evans, 1937
Osmodes laronia (Hewitson, 1868)
Osmodes lindseyi Miller, 1964
Osmodes lux Holland, 1892
Osmodes omar Swinhoe, 1916
Osmodes thora (Plötz, 1884)
Parosmodes lentiginosa (Holland, 1896)
Paracleros biguttulus (Mabille, 1890)
Paracleros substrigata (Holland, 1893)
Osphantes ogowena (Mabille, 1891)
Acleros bibundica Strand, 1913
Acleros mackenii olaus (Plötz, 1884)
Acleros nigrapex Strand, 1913
Acleros ploetzi Mabille, 1890
Acleros sparsum Druce, 1909
Semalea arela (Mabille, 1891)
Semalea atrio (Mabille, 1891)
Semalea kola Evans, 1937
Semalea pulvina (Plötz, 1879)
Semalea sextilis (Plötz, 1886)
Hypoleucis ophiusa (Hewitson, 1866)
Hypoleucis sophia Evans, 1937
Hypoleucis tripunctata truda Evans, 1937
Meza banda (Evans, 1937)
Meza cybeutes (Holland, 1894)
Meza elba (Evans, 1937)
Meza indusiata (Mabille, 1891)
Meza leucophaea (Holland, 1894)
Meza mabea (Holland, 1894)
Meza meza (Hewitson, 1877)
Paronymus budonga (Evans, 1938)
Paronymus nevea (Druce, 1910)
Paronymus xanthias (Mabille, 1891)
Paronymus xanthioides (Holland, 1892)
Andronymus caesar (Fabricius, 1793)
Andronymus evander (Mabille, 1890)
Andronymus fenestrella Bethune-Baker, 1908
Andronymus gander Evans, 1947
Andronymus helles Evans, 1937
Andronymus hero Evans, 1937
Andronymus marcus Usher, 1980
Andronymus neander (Plötz, 1884)
Chondrolepis nero Evans, 1937
Chondrolepis niveicornis (Plötz, 1883)
Zophopetes cerymica (Hewitson, 1867)
Zophopetes dysmephila (Trimen, 1868)
Zophopetes ganda Evans, 1937
Zophopetes haifa Evans, 1937
Gamia buchholzi (Plötz, 1879)
Gamia shelleyi (Sharpe, 1890)
Artitropa cama Evans, 1937
Artitropa comus (Stoll, 1782)
Artitropa reducta Aurivillius, 1925
Mopala orma (Plötz, 1879)
Gretna balenge (Holland, 1891)
Gretna carmen Evans, 1937
Gretna cylinda (Hewitson, 1876)
Gretna lacida (Hewitson, 1876)
Gretna leakeyi Collins & Larsen, 1995
Gretna waga (Plötz, 1886)
Gretna zaremba (Plötz, 1884)
Pteroteinon caenira (Hewitson, 1867)
Pteroteinon capronnieri (Plötz, 1879)
Pteroteinon ceucaenira (Druce, 1910)
Pteroteinon concaenira Belcastro & Larsen, 1996
Pteroteinon iricolor (Holland, 1890)
Pteroteinon laterculus (Holland, 1890)
Pteroteinon laufella (Hewitson, 1868)
Pteroteinon pruna Evans, 1937
Leona binoevatus (Mabille, 1891)
Leona maracanda (Hewitson, 1876)
Leona lota Evans, 1937
Leona lena Evans, 1937
Leona leonora (Plötz, 1879)
Leona stoehri (Karsch, 1893)
Leona meloui (Riley, 1926)
Leona halma Evans, 1937
Leona lissa Evans, 1937
Leona luehderi (Plötz, 1879)
Caenides soritia (Hewitson, 1876)
Caenides kangvensis Holland, 1896
Caenides xychus (Mabille, 1891)
Caenides benga (Holland, 1891)
Caenides otilia Belcastro, 1990
Caenides dacenilla Aurivillius, 1925
Caenides dacela (Hewitson, 1876)
Caenides hidaroides Aurivillius, 1896
Caenides dacena (Hewitson, 1876)
Monza alberti (Holland, 1896)
Monza cretacea (Snellen, 1872)
Melphina flavina Lindsey & Miller, 1965
Melphina malthina (Hewitson, 1876)
Melphina melphis (Holland, 1893)
Melphina noctula (Druce, 1909)
Melphina statirides (Holland, 1896)
Melphina tarace (Mabille, 1891)
Melphina unistriga (Holland, 1893)
Fresna carlo Evans, 1937
Fresna cojo (Karsch, 1893)
Fresna jacquelinae Collins & Larsen, 2003
Fresna maesseni Miller, 1971
Fresna netopha (Hewitson, 1878)
Fresna nyassae (Hewitson, 1878)
Platylesches batangae (Holland, 1894)
Platylesches galesa (Hewitson, 1877)
Platylesches lamba Neave, 1910
Platylesches picanini (Holland, 1894)
Platylesches robustus villa Evans, 1937

Baorini
Zenonia zeno (Trimen, 1864)
Borbo fallax (Gaede, 1916)
Borbo fanta (Evans, 1937)
Borbo fatuellus (Hopffer, 1855)
Borbo gemella (Mabille, 1884)
Borbo perobscura (Druce, 1912)
Parnara monasi (Trimen & Bowker, 1889)

Heteropterinae
Metisella abdeli (Krüger, 1928)
Metisella kambove gamma de Jong
Metisella kumbona Evans, 1937
Metisella midas malda Evans, 1937
Metisella tsadicus (Aurivillius, 1905)
Lepella lepeletier (Latreille, 1824)

See also
Geography of Cameroon
Cameroonian Highlands forests

References

Seitz, A. Die Gross-Schmetterlinge der Erde 13: Die Afrikanischen Tagfalter. Plates
Seitz, A. Die Gross-Schmetterlinge der Erde 13: Die Afrikanischen Tagfalter. Text 

 Butt
Cameroon
Cameroon
Cameroon
Butterflies